The Carson City Kid is a 1940 American Western film directed by Joseph Kane starring Roy Rogers, George "Gabby" Hayes, and Bob Steele.

Plot

The Carson City Kid (Roy Rogers) is a stagecoach robber seeking vengeance on Morgan Reynolds (Bob Steele), the man who killed his brother. Reynolds is travelling with Laramie (Francis McDonald), a notorious half-breed outlaw. Rogers falls in love with saloon singer Joby Madison (Pauline Moore). George "Gabby" Hayes appears as Sheriff Gabby Whittaker.

Cast

 Roy Rogers as The Carson City Kid
 George "Gabby" Hayes as Marshal Gabby Whitaker
 Bob Steele as Lee Jessup / Morgan Reynolds
 Noah Beery, Jr. as Scott 'Arizona' Warren
 Pauline Moore as Joby Madison
 Francis McDonald as Laramie
 Hal Taliaferro as Rick Harmon
 Arthur Loft as Saloon drunk
 George Rosener as Judge Tucker
 Chester Gan as Wong Lee

Soundtrack
 Pauline Moore – "The Golddigger Song" (Music and lyrics by Peter Tinturin)
 Pauline Moore – "You Are the One" (Music and lyrics by Peter Tinturin)
 Roy Rogers – "Sonora Moon" (Music and lyrics by Peter Tinturin)
 "Oh Susanna" (Music and lyrics by Stephen Foster as Stephen Collins Foster)
 "Camptown Races" (Music and lyrics by Stephen Foster as Stephen Collins Foster)
 "Polly Wolly Doodle"
 "Little Brown Jug" (Written by Joseph Winner)

See also
 Public domain film
 List of American films of 1940
 List of films in the public domain in the United States

External links

 
 

1940 films
American black-and-white films
Republic Pictures films
American Western (genre) films
1940 Western (genre) films
American romance films
1940s romance films
Films directed by Joseph Kane
1940s English-language films
1940s American films